The 1983–84 FIBA Korać Cup was the 13th edition of FIBA's Korać Cup basketball competition. The French Orthez defeated the Yugoslav Crvena zvezda in the final on March 15, 1984 in Paris, France. The was the third consecutive year in which a French team defeated a Yugoslav team in the final, and the third French victory overall.

First round

|}

Second round

|}

*İTÜ and Olympiacos withdrew before the first leg, and their rivals received a forfeit (2–0) in both games.

Automatically qualified to round of 16
  Šibenka
  Star Varese
  Moderne

Round of 16

Semi finals

|}

Final
March 15, Palais des sports Pierre-de-Coubertin, Paris

|}

External links
 1983–84 FIBA Korać Cup @ linguasport.com
1983–84 FIBA Korać Cup

1983–84
1983–84 in European basketball